The Barron County Pipestone Quarry is a sacred site in Native American history located in Doyle, Wisconsin, United States. It was added to the National Register of Historic Places in 1978.

Description
Several tribes have used rock from the quarry to create ceremonial pipes. Historically, various tribes would travel long distances to acquire the special red-colored stone found in the quarry. A widespread legend among the tribes is that the stone gets its color from the flesh and blood of their ancestors.

References

Archaeological sites on the National Register of Historic Places in Wisconsin
Native American history of Wisconsin
Properties of religious function on the National Register of Historic Places in Wisconsin
Quarries in the United States
National Register of Historic Places in Barron County, Wisconsin